Alberto "Tito" Malagón Amate (born 2 July 1988), is a Spanish footballer who play for Las Rozas CF as a midfielder.

Career
On 28 March 2019, after the club's dissolution, Tito left Ontinyent.

References

External links
 
 

1988 births
Living people
Footballers from Madrid
Spanish footballers
Spanish expatriate footballers
Association football midfielders
Segunda División B players
Tercera División players
Czech First League players
Austrian Football Bundesliga players
RSD Alcalá players
Rayo Vallecano B players
Marino de Luanco footballers
CF Fuenlabrada footballers
UE Olot players
Ontinyent CF players
FC Admira Wacker Mödling players
FC Hradec Králové players
Real Balompédica Linense footballers
Internacional de Madrid players
Orihuela CF players
CF La Nucía players
Las Rozas CF players
Expatriate footballers in Austria
Expatriate footballers in the Czech Republic
Spanish expatriate sportspeople in Austria
Spanish expatriate sportspeople in the Czech Republic
CF Gandía players